Elpida Xylofagou is a Cypriot football club based in the village of Xylofagou in Larnaca district. The club, which was established in 1959, currently competes in the Cypriot Second Division, after a successful campaign in the Cypriot Third Division, from which it gains the promotion.  Their colors are white and blue.

In recent years, the team has also regularly participated in the Cypriot Cup.

Stadium
The team uses the Michalonikion Stadion, as a  home stadium. The stadium has a capacity of 2,000 fans.

Achievements
Cypriot Third Division Winners: 2
 1987, 2014
Cypriot Cup for lower divisions Winners: 1
 2009

References

Football clubs in Cyprus
Football clubs in Larnaca
Association football clubs established in 1959
1959 establishments in Cyprus